Stonefield is the debut studio album by Australian Psychedelic rock band Stonefield. It was released on October 10, 2013 under Illusive and Wunderkind.

Track listing

Personnel

Stonefield
 Amy Findlay – vocal, drums
 Hannah Findlay – guitar
 Holly Findlay – bass
 Sarah Findlay – keys, vocal

Additional musicians
 Phil Heuzenroeder – choir (track 3)
 Melbourne Mass Gospel Choir – choir (track 3)

Production
 Ian Davenport – engineer, producer
 Matthew Neighbour – engineer
 Travis Kennedy – assistant engineer
 Justin Shturtz – mastering
 Tim Palmer – mixing
 Jo Duck – photography
 Karl Kwansy – art direction, design
 Lauren Dietze – stylist

References

2013 debut albums
Stonefield (band) albums